"Someone's in Love" is the name of a 1988 US only remixed single by British pop group Five Star. It reached #36 on the US R&B Billboard chart. The single was the third of five releases from their album and the lead single from the album Rock the World in USA.

Doris sang the lead vocals on this track rather than sister Denise, who was lead singer on all of Five Star's singles up to this point.

The Radio Mix was used on the US edition of the Rock the World album.

Track listings
7" single
 Someone's In Love (7" Radio Mix) 4:08 – featured on US pressing of Rock The World album *
 Rare Groove

12" single

 Someone's In Love (R&B Dance Mix w/o Rap)
 Someone's In Love (Some Dub Mix)
 Someone's In Love (LP Mix) – NB version not actually featured on LP
 Someone's In Love (7" Radio Mix) – featured on US pressing of Rock the World album
 Rare Groove

All tracks available on the remastered versions of either the 2012 'Rock The World' album, the 2013 'The Remix Anthology (The Remixes 1984-1991)' or the 2018 'Luxury - The Definitive Anthology 1984-1991' boxset.

References 

1988 singles
Five Star songs
Songs written by Doris Pearson
Songs written by Delroy Pearson
1988 songs
RCA Records singles